Pop Gear (U.S. title: Go Go Mania) is a British music revue film, directed by Frederic Goode, which was released in 1965. It contains live concert footage of the Beatles, and lip-synched performances of some of the British Invasion bands, including the Animals, Herman's Hermits, the Nashville Teens, Peter and Gordon, Matt Monro, Billy J. Kramer and the Dakotas, the Honeycombs, the Rockin' Berries, and the Spencer Davis Group. The film is split into two segments: 1964 songs, introduced by Jimmy Savile, who at the time was the host of Top of the Pops on the BBC, and 1965 songs, which are merely strung together without intros. The material by the Beatles was lifted from a newsreel short The Beatles Come to Town (1963). The film was released sometime between January and April 1965, the footage having been filmed in December 1964.

Artists and songs in order:

Spanish version
For Spanish-speaking territories, director Anibal Uset shot Spanish introductions by Argentinian stars Palito Ortega and Graciela Borges to replace the Jimmy Savile introductions, and that version was released as El Rey en Londres.

External links 
 

1965 films
Concert films
The Beatles in film
American International Pictures films
Jimmy Savile
1960s English-language films